The 2017 Barcelona Women World Winner was a professional tennis tournament played on outdoor clay courts. It was the third edition of the tournament and part of the 2017 ITF Women's Circuit, offering a total of $60,000 in prize money. It took place in Barcelona, Spain, from 12–18 June 2017.

Point distribution

Singles main draw entrants

Seeds 

 1 Rankings as of 29 May 2017

Other entrants 
The following players received wildcards into the singles main draw:
  Paula Badosa Gibert
  Mirjam Björklund
  Cristina Bucșa
  María Teresa Torró Flor

The following player received entry by a special exempt:
  Andrea Gámiz

The following players received entry from the qualifying draw:
  Irene Burillo Escorihuela
  Tena Lukas
  Marta Paigina
  Renata Zarazúa

The following players received entry as lucky losers:
  Manon Arcangioli
  Isabelle Wallace

Champions

Singles

 Daniela Seguel def.  Amandine Hesse, 3–6, 7–6(7–5), 7–6(7–3)

Doubles

 Montserrat González /  Sílvia Soler Espinosa def.  Julia Glushko /  Priscilla Hon, 6–4, 6–3

External links 
 2017 Barcelona Women World Winner at ITFtennis.com
 Official website

2017 in Spanish sport
2017 ITF Women's Circuit
2017
2017